Gridinskaya is a rural locality (a village) in Mityukovskoye Rural Settlement, Vozhegodsky District, Vologda Oblast, Russia. The population was 22 as of 2002.

Geography 
The distance to Vozhega is 72 km and 4 km to Sosnovitsa. Galuninskaya, Sigovskaya, Bykovskaya are the nearest rural localities.

References 

Rural localities in Vozhegodsky District